Tamara Alekseyevna Lyukhina-Zamotaylova (née Lyukhina: born 11 May 1939) is a former Soviet gymnast who won four Olympic medals at the 1960 and 1964 Summer Olympics.

Lyukhina graduated from Voronezh State University in 1963 and later from the Voronezh Institute of Physical Eductation in 1988. After retiring from competition, she worked as gymnastics coach and referee. She became an international gymnastics referee in 1975.

References

1939 births
Living people
Soviet female artistic gymnasts
Gymnasts at the 1960 Summer Olympics
Gymnasts at the 1964 Summer Olympics
Olympic gymnasts of the Soviet Union
Olympic gold medalists for the Soviet Union
Olympic bronze medalists for the Soviet Union
People from Voronezh
Olympic medalists in gymnastics
Medalists at the 1964 Summer Olympics
Medalists at the 1960 Summer Olympics
Universiade medalists in gymnastics
Voronezh State University alumni
Universiade silver medalists for the Soviet Union
Medalists at the 1961 Summer Universiade